Bracknell Forest Borough Council is the local authority for Bracknell Forest, a unitary authority in Berkshire, England. Until 1 April 1998 it was a non-metropolitan district.

Political control
Since the first election to the council in 1973 political control of the council has been held by the following parties:

Non-metropolitan district

Unitary authority

Leadership
The leaders of the council since 1984 have been:

Council elections

Non-metropolitan district elections
1973 Bracknell District Council election
1976 Bracknell District Council election
1979 Bracknell District Council election (New ward boundaries, number of seats increased from 31 to 40)
1983 Bracknell District Council election
1987 Bracknell Forest Borough Council election
1991 Bracknell Forest Borough Council election (Borough boundary changes took place but the number of seats remained the same)
1995 Bracknell Forest Borough Council election

Unitary authority elections
1997 Bracknell Forest Borough Council election
2000 Bracknell Forest Borough Council election
2003 Bracknell Forest Borough Council election (New ward boundaries increased the number of seats by 2)
2007 Bracknell Forest Borough Council election
2011 Bracknell Forest Borough Council election
2015 Bracknell Forest Borough Council election
2019 Bracknell Forest Borough Council election
2023 Bracknell Forest Borough Council election (New ward boundaries decreased the number of seats by 1)

By-election results

1997–2000

2000–2003

2003–2007

2007–2011

2011-2015

2015-2019

2019-2023

References

By-election results

External links
Bracknell Forest Council

 
Council elections in Berkshire
Unitary authority elections in England